Shake Hands with the Devil is a 1959 film produced and directed by Michael Anderson and starring James Cagney, Don Murray, Dana Wynter, Glynis Johns and Michael Redgrave.  The picture was filmed in Dublin, and at Ardmore Studios in Bray, Ireland. The picture was based on the 1933 novel of the same title by Rearden Conner, the son of a Royal Irish Constabulary policeman.

The film is set in 1921 Dublin, where the Irish Republican Army battles the Black and Tans, ex-British soldiers sent to suppress the rebels.

Plot
Irish-American Kerry O'Shea (Don Murray) is studying at the College of Surgeons in 1921 Dublin, Ireland, during a guerrilla war – the Irish War of Independence.  Apolitical and sick of killing after fighting in World War I, he is drawn into the struggle between the Irish Republican Army (IRA) and the British Black and Tans.

He and his friend and fellow medical student, Paddy Nolan (Ray McAnally), are caught in the middle of an IRA ambush, and Nolan is shot by the British. Nolan tells O'Shea to fetch Sean Lenihan (James Cagney), one of their professors. Lenihan, it turns out, is also a high-ranking IRA leader known as "the Commandant". Lenihan removes the bullet, but Nolan dies anyway.

Since O'Shea left his textbook (with his name inscribed) at the scene of the ambush, he is now a wanted man. Lenihan takes him to meet his superior, "the General" (Michael Redgrave), an old comrade-in-arms of O'Shea's father. When O'Shea refuses his invitation to join the IRA, the General arranges for a boat passage out of Ireland. Lenihan takes him to a hideout by the sea, the base of an IRA unit commanded by Chris Noonan (Cyril Cusack). Lenihan is furious to find local barmaid Kitty Brady (Glynis Johns) consorting with the men there.

When Liam O'Sullivan (Noel Purcell), a top IRA leader, is wounded escaping from prison, O'Shea agrees to accompany the unit to the rendezvous point to treat him. O'Sullivan is discovered in the boot of the car of aged Lady Fitzhugh (Sybil Thorndike) and killed in a shootout by the British. When the soldiers check the people in the nearby pub (where the IRA men are waiting), Terence O'Brien (Richard Harris) tries to hide a pistol he brought (against Noonan's explicit orders). When it is found, it is O'Shea who is taken away. He is brutally beaten by Colonel Smithson of the Black and Tans (Christopher Rhodes), but refuses to talk. Lenihan leads a raid to rescue him. At that point, O'Shea decides to join the IRA.

Lady Fitzhugh is sentenced to prison and goes on a hunger strike. Lenihan kidnaps Jennifer Curtis (Dana Wynter), the widowed daughter of a top British adviser, to try to force a prisoner exchange. Complications ensue when Kerry falls for her. When Kitty gets into trouble, both with Lenihan and the British, she decides to leave Ireland.

Lenihan prepares to assassinate Colonel Smithson at the dock. However, he suspects he has been betrayed when Kitty, purely by coincidence, tries to board a ship there. During the ensuing shootout, Lenihan shoots Kitty dead in cold blood.

When the men reassemble at a lighthouse, they hear two bits of news. First, Lady Fitzhugh has died. Second, the British have offered a peace treaty. The General is satisfied to have peace, but not Lenihan. When he decides to execute Mrs. Curtis, O'Shea has to stop him. They exchange shots, and Lenihan is killed.

Cast

 James Cagney as Sean Lenihan
 Don Murray as Kerry O'Shea
 Dana Wynter as Jennifer Curtis
 Glynis Johns as Kitty Brady
 Michael Redgrave as The General
 Sybil Thorndike as Lady Fitzhugh
 Cyril Cusack as Chris Noonan
 Harry Brogan as Tom Cassidy
 Robert Brown as First Sergeant (Black and Tans)
 Lewis Casson as Judge
 Christopher Casson as Brigadier
 John Cairney as Mike O'Callaghan
 Harry H. Corbett as Clancy (as Harry Corbett)
 Allan Cuthbertson as Captain
 Donal Donnelly as Willie Lafferty
 Eithne Dunne as Eileen O'Leary
 Richard Harris as Terence O'Brien
 William Hartnell as Sergeant Jenkins
 John Le Mesurier as British General
 Niall MacGinnis as Michael O'Leary
 Patrick McAlinney as Donovan, bartender
 Ray McAnally as Paddy Nolan
 Clive Morton as Sir Arnold Fielding
 Noel Purcell as Liam O'Sullivan
 Peter Reynolds as Captain (Black and Tans)
 Christopher Rhodes as Colonel Smithson

Release
The film received its world premiere on 21 May 1959 in Dublin.

References

External links
 
 
 
 Shake Hands with the Devil at the blog Come Here to Me! about Dublin
Review of film at Variety

1959 films
1959 drama films
Irish drama films
1950s English-language films
British Empire war films
Films about the Irish Republican Army
Films directed by Michael Anderson
Films set in 1921
Films set in Dublin (city)
Films shot in the Republic of Ireland
Irish War of Independence films
Films scored by William Alwyn
American war drama films
1950s American films